Matt or Matthew Wright may refer to:

Sports
 Matthew Wright (basketball) (born 1991), Filipino-Canadian basketball player
 Matthew Wright (Australian footballer) (born 1989), Australian rules footballer
 Matthew Wright (rugby league) (born 1991), New Zealand-born Samoan rugby league international
 Matthew Wright (American football) (born 1996), American football kicker
 Matthew Wright (Scottish footballer) (born 2002), Scottish footballer

Others
 Matthew Wright (presenter) (born 1965), English television presenter and former tabloid journalist
 Matthew N. Wright (born 1959), Pennsylvania politician
 Matt Wright (singer), lead singer of the Garage punk band Gas Huffer
 Matt Wright, actor best known for his early-1990s role as Mike in Mike and Angelo
 Matthew Wright, lead singer and guitarist of The Getaway Plan
 Matthew Phillip Wright, perpetrator of the Hoover Dam Incident, inspired by QAnon
 Matt Wilson who starred in the Outback Wrangler Australian television show

See also 
 Matt's Script Archive, a collection of CGI scripts started by high school student Matt Wright in 1995